Majster Kat is a thrash metal band from Bratislava, Slovakia.
The music created by Majster Kat is technical, with many melodic lines and frequent changing of moods.

Biography
Majster Kat was founded by Slymak (vocals) and Gabo (guitar) in 2001. In 2002, the original lineup was completed with Sigi (drums) and Los (lead guitar).

In this line-up Majster Kat had a lot of concerts including the summer metal festivals in Slovakia and recorded its first demo record. In August 2004, after 2 years of seeking for a bass guitar player, Tapyr joined the band.

The year 2005 is marked with a lot of member changing the band. Since 2006 the band has performed in formation Slymak (vocals), Los ( lead guitar), Lukas (guitar), Tapyr (bass) and Bubonix (drums).

In this lineup the first album called Svätá zvrhlosť (in translation it means "Depravity of The Pious") was released in October 2007 under the Czech label Panda Music.

Current members
 Slymák – vocals
 Los – lead guitar and backing vocals
 Lukáš – guitar
 Tapyr – bass and backing vocals
 Bubonix – drums

Discography

Official releases 
 Svätá zvrhlosť 2007 - (CD)
 Memento... 2014 - (CD)

Demo recording and live releases 
 2003 - Live in Dreváreň
 2004 - Demo
  Naživo v Bratislave 2007 - (DVD)

External links
 www.majsterkat.sk - The official band site
 myspace.com/majsterkat The official MYSPACE profile

Thrash metal musical groups
Slovak heavy metal musical groups
Musical groups established in 2001
Musical quintets
2001 establishments in Slovakia